Souček (feminine Součková) is a Czech surname. Notable people include:
 Andy Soucek, Spanish professional racing driver
 Apollo Soucek, American pilot
 Dan Soucek, American politician
 Filip Souček, Czech footballer
 František Souček, Czech athlete
 Jan Souček, Czech canoer
 Jaroslav Souček, Czech opera singer
 Karel Soucek, Czech-Canadian stuntman
 Ladislav Souček, Czech canoer
 Ludvík Souček, Czech writer
 Milada Součková, Czech writer
 Stanislava Součková, Czech opera singer
 Tomáš Souček, Czech footballer
 Zdeněk Souček, Czech-Australian physician and explorer

See also
 

Czech-language surnames